Peel Park was a football stadium in Accrington, Lancashire that was the home of Accrington Stanley F.C. between 1919 until their dissolution in 1966.

The record attendance was set in a friendly match against Blackburn Rovers on 15 November 1954 with 17,634 spectators in attendance. The record for a league match occurred against York City on 11 April 1955 with 15,425 spectators.

References
Article on stadium
Stadium information

Accrington Stanley F.C.
Defunct football venues in England
Accrington
Buildings and structures in Hyndburn
Sport in Hyndburn
Sports venues completed in 1919
English Football League venues